The Malwa Subah was one of the original twelve Subahs (imperial provinces) of the Mughal Empire, including Gondwana, from 1568-1743. Its seat was Ujjain. It bordered Berar, Kandesh, Ahmadnagar (Deccan), Gujarat, Ajmer, Agra and Allahabad subahs as well as the independent and tributary chiefdoms in the east.

History 
Malwa was earlier an independent sultanate. Its last ruler Baz Bahadur was defeated and its capital Mandu was conquered in 1562 by the Mughal Emperor Akbar’s army led by Abdullah Khan, the Uzbeg. He  was appointed its first governor. In 1564 he was replaced by Qara Bahadur Khan. In 1568 it became a subah of Mughal empire. One of its last governors was Sawai Jai Singh, who was the governor of the Subah for three times, from 1714-17, from 1729-30 and from 28 September 1732 to 4 August 1737. The Mughal hold on Malwa ended in 1743, when Peshwa Balaji Baji Rao obtained the formal grant of Naib-subahdari (deputy governorship) of Malwa.

Administrative divisions
Malwa Subah comprised 12 sarkars (districts): Ujjain, Chanderi, Raisen, Garha Mandla, Sarangpur, Bijagarh, Mandu, Handia, Nandurbar, Mandsaur, Gagron and Kotri-Parava. These sarkars are further divided into 301 parganas. The city of Ujjain was the capital of the subah. 

The sarkars (districts) and the parganas (tehsils) of Malwa Subah were:

Mughal Subahdars (Governors) of Malwa (1561 – 1737)

See also 
 Malwa Sultanate
 Malwa

Notes 

Mughal subahs
History of Malwa
History of Ujjain
1568 establishments in India